Cham-e Anayeh (also Romanized as Cham-e ‘Anāyeh, Cham ‘Anāyeh, and Cham-e ‘Enā’īyeh; also known as Cham) is a village in Abdoliyeh-ye Sharqi Rural District, in the Central District of Ramshir County, Khuzestan Province, Iran. At the 2006 census, its population was 408, in 61 families.

References 

Populated places in Ramshir County